Pilkholi is a village located in the Almora district of Uttarakhand state, India. It is located close to Ranikhet and Chaubatia. The village had a population of 1,154 in 2011.

References

Villages in Almora district